Hansengross is an independent fashion label started in 2006. The company is based in New York City and is known for its socially responsible, locally produced bags for men, women, and travel.

History and collections 

Hansengross believes their bags are a juxtaposition of artwork and luxury goods, that is why they produce each line in limited editions.  The bag designs are minimalist and structural while still fluid.

The company has been mentioned for its fusion of underground avant-garde and traditional craftsmanship, and featured on the cover of Women's Wear Daily and in New York fashion magazines like Nylon. Other magazines and websites have referred to Hansengross as an "upcoming brand," "keep an eye out," and "the 'it' bag that doesn't know it yet" since their premier 2006 collection.

References

High fashion brands
Companies based in New York City
Manufacturing companies established in 2006